Manuel Ignacio Lago (born 5 August 2002) is an Argentine professional footballer who plays as a left winger or forward for San Martín SJ, on loan from Talleres de Córdoba.

Career
Lago is a product of Almirante Brown's youth system. He made the move into senior football at the age of fifteen, featuring off the substitutes four times in the 2017–18 season. His debut arrived on 10 February 2018 versus Atlanta, as he was substituted in on eighty-four minutes to become Almirante Brown's youngest ever debutant in competitive football; aged fifteen years, six months and five days to surpass Jonathan Casasola's record as a sixteen-year-old from 2009. In his sixth appearance, on 17 March 2019, Lago scored his first senior goal in a victory over Colegiales. Overall, he scored three goals in thirty-one games for them.

On 11 September 2020, Lago completed a transfer to Primera División side Talleres.

Career statistics
.

References

External links

2002 births
Living people
Argentine footballers
Argentine expatriate footballers
People from La Matanza Partido
Sportspeople from Buenos Aires Province
Association football forwards
Primera B Metropolitana players
Club Almirante Brown footballers
Talleres de Córdoba footballers
Tlaxcala F.C. players
San Martín de San Juan footballers
Argentine expatriate sportspeople in Mexico
Expatriate footballers in Mexico